Sardar Vallabhbhai Patel Chowk is a chowk, located in Katra Gulab Singh Tiraha, Pratapgarh, Uttar Pradesh, India.

Landmarks
A statue of Sardar Vallabhbhai Patel is located in this chowk.

References 

Pratapgarh district, Uttar Pradesh
Memorials to Vallabhbhai Patel